Iradier Arena, also known as Plaza de Toros de Vitoria-Gasteiz, is an arena and bullring in Vitoria-Gasteiz, Spain. It is primarily used for bullfighting and basketball, and was the home to the Baskonia while the Fernando Buesa Arena was expanded. It opened in 1941 and holds 10,625 spectators.

Attendances
This is a list of league and EuroLeague games attendances of Baskonia at Iradier Arena.

See also
List of indoor arenas in Spain

References

External links

 

Indoor arenas in Spain
Bullrings in Spain
Sports venues in the Basque Country (autonomous community)